Kutty Padmini is an Indian actress who mainly works in Tamil cinema. She was a child star in her debut movie Ambala Anjulam (1959). She has also acted in Telugu, Kannada, Malayalam and Hindi movies. She made her debut in Tamil cinema at the age of 3. She has acted with prominent personalities of Tamil cinema, including Sivaji Ganesan, M. G. Ramachandran, Gemini Ganesan, Jaishankar, Rajinikanth and Kamal Haasan. She was the first female artist from Tamil Nadu to win the National Film Award for Best Child Artist for the movie Kuzhandaiyum Deivamum. The first Tamil child artiste to win the award was Kamal Haasan for Kalathur Kannamma.

Kutty Padmini also established herself as supporting actress in movies such as Penmani Aval Kanmani, Aval Appadithan, Avargal, Sakalakala Sammandhi etc.., She made a foray into TV serials productions through her Vaishnavi Films Enterprises Limited and produced many of the finest works of the day, including Krishnadasi (2016 TV series), Romapuri Pandian and Ramanujar.

Kutty Padmini is also the executive member in Nadigar Sangam, one of the directors in Blue Ocean Films and Television Academy, managing director of Kreeda Sports Foundation and Brand owner of Kreeda Cup, an initiative by Kreeda Sports foundation to support young athletes.

Career
Padmini entered filmdom at the age of 3. She went on to act in many movies as child artist. However, her notable film role was in the 1965 Tamil film Kuzhandaiyum Deivamum along with Jaishankar and Jamuna, where she played dual roles. She received the National Film Award for Best Child Artist for her performance and she is the first person from Tamil Nadu to have received this award since its inception. This film was subsequently remade in Telugu, Kannada, Malayalam and Hindi and she was felicitated for her role by both Kannada and Andhra state governments. She was also acted in various movies such as Pasamalar, Navarathri, Leta Manasulu, Odayil Ninnu, etc.., She stunned everyone with her performance in the movie Thiruvarutchelvar as a young girl "Ponni", who answered the King's three questions and also in Thirumal Perumai as young Andal, which was widely appreciated.

Political life 
Kutty Padmini joined BJP in the presence of party president Nitin Gadkari on February 2011.

Filmography

Tamil

Telugu

Malayalam

Kannada

Hindi

TV serials

Web series

Awards and honors

 National Award as the "Best Child Artiste" for the film Kuzhandaiyum Deivamum
Kutty Padmini Actress Felicitated by Rotary Club of Madras

Best Producer for "Cinta Bollywood" from former President of Singapore- S. R. Nathan
Gold Award from Indian Content Leadership Awards in 2109 for best thriller content on an OTT platform- Maya Thirrai by Vaishnave Mediaa Works Limited 
Kalaimamani Award in 2011  from Tamil Nadu Iyal Isai Nataka Mandram.
Lifetime Achievement award in the South Indian Cinematographers Association (SICA) Awards 2015

References

External links
 
 vaishnaves Media Works
 Kutty Padmini Felicitated - Awards - Local Newspaper | Chennai News

Tamil actresses
Actresses from Chennai
Actresses in Tamil cinema
Actresses in Telugu cinema
Kerala State Film Award winners
Living people
Indian film actresses
Indian women film producers
Film producers from Chennai
Actresses in Malayalam cinema
20th-century Indian actresses
21st-century Indian actresses
Indian women television producers
Indian child actresses
Businesswomen from Tamil Nadu
Best Child Artist National Film Award winners
20th-century Indian businesswomen
20th-century Indian businesspeople
21st-century Indian businesswomen
21st-century Indian businesspeople
Women television producers
Actresses in Hindi cinema
Actresses in Tamil television
Actresses in Telugu television
Actresses in Hindi television
Child actresses in Malayalam cinema
Year of birth missing (living people)
Tamil television directors
Tamil television producers
Tamil television writers